La Duquesa Sugar Mill, founded in 1882 by American machinist Alejandro Bass and F. Von Krosigh, is located in the Distrito Nacional (National District) of the Dominican Republic.

World Heritage Status 
This site was added to the UNESCO World Heritage Tentative List on April 5, 2002 in the Cultural category.

Notes

References 
Nuestra Señora de Monte Alegre or la Duquesa Sugar Mill [Ruta de Los Ingenios] - UNESCO World Heritage Centre Accessed 2009-02-26.

Betances, E (1995), State and Society in the Dominican Republic, Westview Press. ISBN

Dominican Republic culture